Basit Jehangir Sheikh (
13 April 1949  –  20 October 2010) was a Pakistani politician who served as the First District President PPP, District Kasur.
 He was an active leader in politics. He was one of the youngest founding member Pakistan Peoples Party of Zulfiqar Ali Bhutto.

Education 
Basit Jehangir Sheikh had his primary education from his local school at Kasur. He passed his intermediate examinations from Islamia Degree College Kasur. He graduated from Forman Christian College University

Political career
Since 26 November 1967, when Basit Jehangir welcomed Shaheed Chairman Bhutto in Kasur, and up to 25 December 2007 (2:30am), when he last met Shaheed Bibi sahiba in Islamabad, it has been a 40-year-long association of loyalty and steadfastness. In return, the confidence and affection that Chairman Bhutto, Begum Nusrat Bhutto, Shaheed Bibi sahiba and now Co-Chairman Asif Ali Zardari have reposed and shown to him over these years is the biggest asset of his life. From 1967 to 2007, each political upheaval and countless detentions have tested his mettle, but each time he has come out more resilient than before.

In March 1968, Begum Nusrat Bhutto started her campaign to obtain Shaheed Bhutto's release from Ayub Khan's detention, from Kasur. Basit Jehangir organized a big protest rally that was led by Begum Sahiba. The passion, anger and impact of the rally is still remembered by (now) prominent TV anchorperson Iftikhar Ahmad.

In 1970, he was appointed the first General Secretary of PPP, Tehsil Kasur. Shaheed Chairman Bhutto visited Kasur on 17 August 1970, inaugurated a Party office in Kasur, attended a reception and addressed a public meeting. It was during this meeting that Basit Jehangir warned the Shaheed Chairman not to award party ticket to Ahmad Raza Kasuri, as betrayal was in Raza Kasuri's blood. Late Messrs Mehmud Ali Kasuri and Rasul Baksh Talpur were present on the occasion, so was Mr. Omar Mehmud Kasuri advocate (younger son of late Mehmud Ali Kasuri), who still remembers the incident. Shaheed Bhutto would always reminisce that early warning.

Chairman Bhutto did not have to wait for long to see the truth behind Basit Jehangir's warning. Ahmad Raza wanted the provincial assembly ticket for Kasur city to be awarded to Yaqub Maan, ex-MPA. Bhutto sahib ignored his choice and awarded it to a party loyalist Ghulam Hyder Sohail. Upon this Ahmad Raza telephoned to Chairman at 70 Clifton and threatened that if this decision was not changed, he won't let Mr. Bhutto enter Punjab. The call was taken by Mr. Mumtaz Ali Bhutto, who gave him a befitting reply. Basit Jehangir's insight impressed the Chairman and brought them further close.

This closeness however created problems elsewhere in the district. Mr. Malik Meraj Khalid was offended with the candid criticism that Basit Jehangir would carry out against hid devious politics in the party. On 7 May 1974, Basit Jehangir was riddled with bullets by Yaqub Mann's son. After six months of hospitalization involving multiple surgeries, he survived and reported back to the Chairman for duty.

In 1976 he was made the first District President of PPP Kasur, by Chairman Bhutto. He became MPA on PPP ticket in 1977 elections. The joy was short lived as he was picked up and detained in Kasur jail in the very first sweep of General Zia's martial law. On 10 December 1978 Begum Bhutto held a meeting in Lahore, which was attended by District Presidents of Lahore, Gujranwala, Sheikhupura and Kasur. Begum Sahiba informed that she were to launch anti-Zia campaign immediately. After all other Presidents expressed their inability to host Begum Sahiba, Basit Jehangir offered his hospitality. So, from the courtyard of his house in Kasur, on 13 December 1978, Begum Sahiba launched save Bhutto campaign. Seven cases under different martial law regulations were registered against him, resulting in repeated detentions. On the advice of party leadership he left Kasur and went in exile, returning in 1980.

He kept the party alive in the dark years of 1980–86. Bibi sahiba on her return to Pakistan in 1986, elevated him to the decision making level by appointing him to be a member of Punjab Parliamentary Board, where again it fell to his lot to continuously confront the Malik Meraj Khalid, Farooq Leghari, Sheikh Rahsid axis. On 17 August 1988, the day Zia ul Haq died, he was with Shaheed Bibi sahiba in 70 Clifton attending the Parliamentary Board meeting.

He contested for NA 107 (NA138) on PPP ticket in the 1988 elections, but was a victim of selective rigging as the establishment had decided to favour PML (N) in the Punjab, and could not let an unbending die hard worker to be in the Assembly. From 1989 to 1996 he served as the PPP General Secretary, Lahore Division. Following the exile of Shaheed Bibi in 1997, he was forced into sidelines.

(Burying) While discussing the unidentified shaheeds of Karsaz tragedy at Garhi Khuda Buksh was his idea, in the presence of Mr. Nisar Khoro (Speaker Sindh Assembly) and Mr. Syed Qaim Ali Shah (Chief Minister of Sindh), which was highly appreciated and accepted by Bibi sahiba).

It is difficult to encapsule forty years of eventful political journey on 2–3 pages. Some milestones have been recalled, many left out. However all the past Presidents of the Punjab PPP would vouch for his antecedents, loyalty and respect that he enjoys amongst even the current leaders of the party.

Achievements 

 Joined Zulfiqar Ali Bhutto as a Student Leader Forman Christian College University Lahore, When Zulfiqar Ali Bhutto 1st time came to His Residence in Kasur (August 1967).
 Joined Pakistan Peoples Party On its First Convention, as A founder Member (30 November 1967).
 Appointed President Pakistan Peoples Party City Kasur In 1969.
 Appointed 1st District President In 1976 on the formation of New District, Kasur.
 It was his struggle and hard work which ended with a new district and the district headquarters become the City Kasur.
 Member Provisional Assembly Punjab (P.P 148) in 1977.
 Begam Nusrat Bhutto Initiated 1st Martial Law open violation campaign from His house in 1978.
 Benazir Bhutto Visited His house in 1979.
 Became member Punjab Council in 1983.
 Appointed as Member Central Parliamentary Board in 1988.
 Awarded National Assembly Ticket from (NA- 107) In 1988.
 Appointed as General Secretary, Lahore Division from 1989 to 1996.

References 

1949 births
Pakistani Muslims
2010 deaths
People from Kasur District
Socialist International
Political parties established in 1967
Pakistan People's Party politicians
Politicians from Punjab, Pakistan
Forman Christian College alumni